Cristina Banegas (born 26 February 1948) is an Argentine film, TV and stage actress. She has appeared in more than fifty films since 1965.

Selected filmography

Awards
International Emmy Award (2012)

References

External links
 
 

1948 births
Living people
Actresses from Buenos Aires
Argentine film actresses
Argentine television actresses
International Emmy Award for Best Actress winners